The Norfolk Southern Lake Pontchartrain Bridge is a rolling lift trunnion bridge that carries a single-track of Norfolk Southern rail line over Lake Pontchartrain between Slidell and New Orleans, Louisiana.

The bridge is heavily used by Norfolk Southern freight trains.  In addition, Amtrak's Crescent passenger train crosses the bridge once, seven days a week, in each direction.

See also
List of bridges in the United States
List of longest bridges in the world

References

External links 
 Norfolk Southern website
 Norfolk Southern Shows its Spirit. Norfolk Southern Corp., 2005.
 Hurricane Katrina Photo Gallery. Norfolk Southern Corp.

Railroad bridges in Louisiana
Bridges in New Orleans
Lake Pontchartrain bridge
Buildings and structures in St. Tammany Parish, Louisiana
Transportation in St. Tammany Parish, Louisiana
Trestle bridges in the United States
Bridges completed in 1884
1884 establishments in Louisiana